Fayette Street Historic District is a national historic district located at Martinsville, Virginia. It encompasses 116 contributing buildings, in a traditionally African-American section of Martinsville.  It includes a variety of commercial, religious, educational and residential buildings dating from the late-19th century through the mid- 20th century.  Notable buildings include the Dennis Hairston House (c. 1910), community Market (1925), Mt. Carmel Church, Grace United Presbyterian Church (c. 1918), Albert Harris Intermediate School, Alex Hairston House (c. 1923), Baldwin Block, Watkins-Hairston Funeral Home (1931), Gordon Building (1941), and the Imperial Savings and Loan (1953).

It was listed on the National Register of Historic Places in 2007.

References

Historic districts on the National Register of Historic Places in Virginia
African-American history of Virginia
Buildings and structures in Martinsville, Virginia
National Register of Historic Places in Martinsville, Virginia